The Tri-Institutional MD-PhD Program is an MD-PhD program based in New York City that was formed by combining earlier MD-PhD programs that had their inceptions in 1972. The current version of the program, which is operated by Weill Cornell Medicine, The Rockefeller University, and the Memorial Sloan-Kettering Cancer Center's Sloan Kettering Institute, was created in 1991. Located in the Upper East Side of New York City, the program is currently directed by Dr. Katharine C. Hsu of the Memorial Sloan-Kettering Cancer Center.

Profile

Students who complete the program are awarded an M.D. from Weill Cornell Medical College and a Ph.D. from either Weill Cornell Medicine Graduate School of Medical Sciences, The Rockefeller University, or the Gerstner Sloan Kettering Graduate School of Biomedical Sciences.

In 2019, the program processed over 500 applications for 18 spots. These positions are funded by the National Institutes of Health Medical Scientist Training Program (MSTP) for the full length of training, which is typically 7–8 years.

In recent years, the program has pioneered a summer program known as "Gateways to the Laboratory" in order to increase the number of students who are from underrepresented backgrounds in science and medicine. Alumni from this program often matriculate in the Tri-Institutional MD–PhD Program, and make up a significant portion of its class.

See also
Weill Medical College of Cornell University
Weill Graduate School of Medical Sciences of Cornell University
Rockefeller University
Memorial Sloan-Kettering Cancer Center
Tri-Institutional Training Program in Computational Biology and Medicine

References

External links
Tri-Institutional MD-PhD Program website
Weill Medical College of Cornell University website
The Rockefeller University
Memorial Sloan-Kettering Cancer Center

Cornell University
1991 establishments in New York City
Rockefeller University
Memorial Sloan Kettering Cancer Center